Rotenturm an der Pinka (Hungarian: Vasvörösvár, Croatian: Verešvar) is a municipality in the Austrian state of Burgenland on the banks of the Pinka River. Administratively the village belongs to the district of Oberwart. Rotenturm is almost merged with the neighbouring Unterwart. The small Hungarian-speaking village of Siget in der Wart (Őrisziget) is part of the municipality of Rotenturm an der Pinka.

Population

References

Cities and towns in Oberwart District